Bradberry is a surname. Notable people with the surname include:

 Gary Bradberry, American stock car racing driver
 James Bradberry, American football player
 Stephen Bradberry, American community organizer in New Orleans, Louisiana
 Charlie Bradberry, American NASCAR driver
 David Bradberry, English nonconformist minister

Other
 Bradberry, Arizona, populated place situated in Cochise County, Arizona

See also 
 Bradbury (surname)
 Bradbury (disambiguation)
 Bradbeer (surname)